Marvin Cheung Kin-tung, GBS OBE JP (20 November 1947 – 13 September 2014) was a Non-official Member of the Executive Council of Hong Kong. He also held the position of Chairman of the Airport Authority Hong Kong and was a Council Member of the Open University of Hong Kong.

Cheung was born and educated in Hong Kong and qualified as a Chartered Accountant in the United Kingdom gaining honours in all parts of his professional examinations. In 2008 he was appointed by the Chief Executive to succeed Victor Fung as Chairman of the Airport Authority. In 2009 he became the non-executive director of HSBC Holdings. At the time of his death, he was also a non-executive Director of Hang Seng Bank, HKR International, Hong Kong Exchanges and Clearing and Sun Hung Kai Properties. Additionally, he represented Hong Kong on the Trustees Reviews Committee of the International Accounting Standards Board. 

Cheung was a member of the Legislative Council, the Urban Council and District Boards. He also served as chairman of the Hong Kong Society of Accountants, Chairman of the Estate Agents Authority and Vice Chairman of the Mandatory Provident Fund Advisory Board, as well as Member of the Board of Inland Revenue, the Standing Committee on Company Law Reform, the Town Planning Board, the Consumer Council, the Council for the Performing Arts and other public service positions. 

Cheung was conferred the Silver Bauhinia Star by the HKSAR in 2000 and later was elevated to Gold Bauhinia Star in 2008. He was also awarded an OBE by the Hong Kong government in 1994. He was awarded a Doctor of Business Administration, honoris causa, by Hong Kong Baptist University in 2003.

Accountancy
By trade he was a Certified Public Accountant. He retired in 2003 as the chairman and CEO of KPMG Hong Kong and China. He held fellowships in both the Institute of Chartered Accountants in England and Wales, as well as the Hong Kong Institute of Certified Public Accountants.

Education
He attended St Paul's Co-Educational College in Hong Kong. He was awarded the honorary doctorate of Business Administration by Hong Kong Baptist University in 2003.

Affiliations
Member of the Barristers Disciplinary Tribunal
Member of the Greater Pearl River Delta Business Council
Member of Operations Review Committee of ICAC
Member of the Witness Protection Review Board
Hon. Treasurer and Council Member of St. Paul's Co-Educational College
Hon. Treasurer and Council Member of St. Stephen's Girls' College
Board member of the Hong Kong International Film Society Ltd.

External links
Profile Asia-Pacific Corporate Governance Conference, hkbu.edu.hk; accessed 14 September 2014.
 Hong Kong Executive/Marvin Cheung biodata], ceo.gov.hk; accessed 14 September 2014.
 Business and Professionals Federation of Hong Kong website; accessed 14 September 2014.
 Tribute to Cheung from the Open University], ouhk.edu.hk; accessed 14 September 2014.

1947 births
2014 deaths
Alumni of Hong Kong Baptist University
Deaths from cancer in Hong Kong
Chinese accountants
Deaths from leukemia
Hong Kong businesspeople
Hong Kong civil servants
Recipients of the Silver Bauhinia Star
Officers of the Order of the British Empire
Members of the Executive Council of Hong Kong
Members of the Urban Council of Hong Kong
District councillors of Eastern District
HSBC people
Sun Hung Kai Properties
HK LegCo Members 1991–1995
KPMG people
Alumni of St. Paul's Co-educational College